Montserrat Creole is a dialect of Leeward Caribbean Creole English spoken in Montserrat.
The number of speakers of Montserrat Creole is below 10,000. Montserrat Creole does not have the status of an official language.

A lot of similarities can be found with Jamaican Creole.

See also
Bajan Creole
Bermudian English
Jamaican English
Saint Kitts Creole

References

Languages of Montserrat
English-based pidgins and creoles
Languages of the African diaspora
English language in the Caribbean
Creoles of the Caribbean